The 2023 Katsina State gubernatorial election will take place on 18 March 2023, to elect the Governor of Katsina State, concurrent with elections to the Katsina State House of Assembly as well as twenty-seven other gubernatorial elections and elections to all other state houses of assembly. The election—which was postponed from its original 11 March date—will be held three weeks after the presidential election and National Assembly elections. Incumbent APC Governor Aminu Bello Masari is term-limited and cannot seek re-election to a third term.

Party primaries were scheduled for between 4 April and 9 June 2022 with the Peoples Democratic Party nominating former Senator for Katsina South Garba Yakubu Lado on 25 May while the All Progressives Congress nominated former SMEDAN Director-General Umar Dikko Radda on 26 May.

Electoral system
The Governor of Katsina State is elected using a modified two-round system. To be elected in the first round, a candidate must receive the plurality of the vote and over 25% of the vote in at least two-thirds of state local government areas. If no candidate passes this threshold, a second round will be held between the top candidate and the next candidate to have received a plurality of votes in the highest number of local government areas.

Background
Katsina State is a highly populated, northwestern state mainly inhabited by ethnic Hausas and Fulanis. It has a growing economy but is facing rising insecurity, desertification, and low education rates.

Politically, the 2019 elections confirmed the state's status as one of the most staunchly APC states in the nation as both Buhari and Bello Masari won the state by wide margins and every single legislative seat on the senatorial, House of Representatives, and House of Assembly levels were carried by APC nominees. At the beginning of his term, Bello Masari said his administration would focus on security, agriculture, water resource management, and education. In terms of his performance, Bello Masari was praised for increasing his government's diversity but was heavily criticized for his response to rising insecurity.

Primary elections
The primaries, along with any potential challenges to primary results, were to take place between 4 April and 3 June 2022 but the deadline was extended to 9 June. According to some activists from the state's northern senatorial district, an informal zoning gentlemen's agreement sets the north to produce the next governor as since the 1999 return of democracy, all Katsina governors have come from either the Central or South senatorial districts. On the other hand, groups from Katsina South Senatorial District are pushing for the office to be retained by their district by claiming that Katsina Central Senatorial District produced the governor for four terms and thus Katsina South should as well.

All Progressives Congress 
In early April 2022, articles suggested that the state APC zoned its nomination to the Katsina Central Senatorial District, but this claim was swiftly denied by a Bello Masari media aide who said no decision on zoning had been made by the party.

Pre-primary analysis centered around which candidate would receive Bello Masari's endorsement or tacit support. On the primary date, the candidates contested an indirect primary at the Muhammadu Dikko Stadium in Katsina that ended with former federal agency head Umar Dikko Radda emerging as the APC nominee after results showed him narrowly defeating Mustapha Muhammad Inuwa and Abbas Umar Masanawa with about 29% of the delegates' votes. In his acceptance speech, Dikko Radda praised the primary organizers and called for unity with his former opponents. Inuwa initially publicly conceded and pledged to support Dikko Radda; however, he later decried the results amid mass defections of his supporters to the NNPP. Post-primary analysis noted the potential bribery of delegates during the primary along with the internal party crisis as Inuwa and others kicked while Dikko Radda had threatened to remove officeholders that did not support him. Dikko Radda initially picked Yusuf Aliyu Musawa as his running mate but Aliyu Musawa withdrew and was replaced by Faruk Lawal Jobe in mid-August. In October, Inuwa defected to the PDP.

Nominated 
 Dikko Umar Radda: former Director-General of the Small and Medium Enterprise Development Agency (2016–2022)
Running mate—Faruk Lawal Jobe: former Commissioner for Budget and Economic Planning

Eliminated in primary 
 Umar Abdullahi Tsauri: 2015 APGA gubernatorial nominee
 Ahmed Musa Dangiwa: former Managing Director/CEO of the Federal Mortgage Bank of Nigeria
 Abdulkarim Dauda: former police officer
 Mustapha Muhammad Inuwa: former Secretary to the State Government (1999–2007; 2015–2022) (defected after the primary to the PDP)
 Faruk Lawal Jobe: former Commissioner for Budget and Economic Planning
 Abbas Umar Masanawa: former Managing Director of the Nigerian Security Printing and Minting Company Limited
 Mannir Yakubu: Deputy Governor (2019–present) and former Commissioner of Agriculture and Natural Resources (2019–2022)
 Abubakar Sadiq Yar'adua: former House of Representatives member for Katsina Central

Declined 
 Abu Ibrahim: former Senator for Katsina South (2003–2007; 2011–2015)
 Sani Mashi: former Director-General of the Nigerian Meteorological Agency (2017–2021)
 Hadi Sirika: Minister of Aviation (2019–present), Minister of State for Aviation (2015–2019), former Senator for Katsina North (2011–2015), and former House of Representatives member

Results

People's Democratic Party 

On the primary date, the four candidates contested an indirect primary that ended with Garba Yakubu Lado—former Senator and the party's 2019 nominee—winning the nomination after results showed him defeating runner-up Salisu Yusuf Majigiri by a 44% margin. In his acceptance speech, Lado praised the primary organizers and thanked the delegates while Yusuf Majigiri publicly conceded and pledged to support Dikko Radda.

Nominated 
 Garba Yakubu Lado: 2019 PDP gubernatorial nominee, former Senator for Katsina South, and former House of Representatives member
Running mate—Ahmed Aminu Yar’Adua: former Managing Director of the National Inland Waterways Authority and cousin of former President Umaru Musa Yar'Adua

Eliminated in primary 
 Shehu Inuwa Imam: former House of Representatives member for Faskari/Kankara/Sabuwa
 Ahmed Aminu Yar’Adua: former Managing Director of the National Inland Waterways Authority and cousin of former President Umaru Musa Yar'Adua
 Salisu Yusuf Majigiri: former state PDP Chairman

Withdrew 
 Muttaqha Rabe Darma: former Executive Secretary of the Petroleum Technology Development Fund (defected prior to the primary to the APC)

Declined 
 Ahmad Babba Kaita: Senator for Katsina North (2018–present) and former House of Representatives member for Kankia/Kusada/Ingawa (2011–2018)

Results

Minor parties 

 Muhammad Bara'u Tanimu (Accord)
Running mate: Salisu Musa
 Garba Sani Dankani (Action Alliance)
Running mate: Jikamshi Dahiru Magaji
 Murtala Ahmed (Action Democratic Party)
Running mate: Usman Hafiz
 Ibrahim Trader Aminu (African Democratic Congress)
Running mate: Musa Usman
 Kabir Kado (Boot Party)
Running mate: Jamilu Muhammad
 Ibrahim Abu-Musawa (Labour Party)
Running mate: Abdullahi Sanusi Tukur
 Muhammad Nura Khalil (New Nigeria Peoples Party)
Running mate: Muttaqha Rabe Darma
 Ishaka Abdullahi (National Rescue Movement)
Running mate: Sade Salisu
 Imran Jaafaru Jino (People's Redemption Party)
Running mate: Kabir Hassan Yaradua
 Ibrahim Babangida Zakari (Social Democratic Party)
Running mate: Ibrahim Suleiman
 Ibrahim Tukur Saude Ingawa (Zenith Labour Party)
Running mate: Auwalu Halliru

Campaign
Post-primary analysis focused on the respective strengths of Radda and Lado but also noted the divides within the state APC that Radda had to contend with. As the general election campaign began in July and August, reporting also pointed out other potential factors like the strength of the APC's incumbency, APC members aggrieved by contentious party primaries, and Lado's southern origin along with the more prominent minor party nominees—Muhammad Nura Khalil (NNPP), Imrana Jino (PRP), and Ibrahim Zakkari (SDP). One of these factors—fallout from the APC primary, dominated much of the pre-campaign period as politicians like Khalil and Lado met with APC primary runner-up Mustapha Muhammad Inuwa and attempted to woo him into their parties; in response, the APC sent its vice presidential nominee Kashim Shettima and others to convince Inuwa to support Radda. However, the Shettima visit failed to prevent Inuwa's defection as he joined the PDP in mid-October with APC sources noting that the defection was likely to hurt the party in the general election. On the other hand, Lado also faced internal issues as a split emerged in the state PDP in early November as his camp attempted to remove state party chair Yusuf Salisu Majigiri, who's backed by former Governor Ibrahim Shema. Lado and his allies accused Salisu Majigiri of supporting the APC and journalists noted rumors that Salisu Majigiri planned to suspend Lado from the party. Although Lado was suspended, Salisu Majigiri claimed that he had already stepped down as party chairman due to his candidacy for the House of Representatives; in an attempt to avoid further rifts, acting party chairman Salisu Lawal Uli ended Lado's suspension but it was too late as Lado's faction claimed Magaji Lawal was the rightful party chairman. To worsen the situation for the PDP, Shema reportedly met with Radda in a move that fueled rumors that his bloc may tacitly support the APC nominee. 

The PDP party crisis continued into the new year, as analysts labeled the scandals as actively hurtful to Lado's campaign by January 2023. In a Daily Trust article from mid-January, the crisis was labeled as the Lado's biggest issue while the largest problem of the Dikko Radda campaign was the unpopularity of incumbent APC administrations. The month also hosted two debates, the first one conducted by Media Trust Group on 14 January and attended by Dikko Radda, Khalil, Jino, Lado, and Zakari; while the second debate was organized by BBC Hausa on 22 January and only Dikko Radda, Khalil, Jino, and Lado were invited to participate. Held at the Local Government Service Commission in the city of Katsina, the BBC debate reviewed topics ranging from education to security. After the debates, the APC continued its attempts to woo Shema into the party, with the state government even withdrawing its corruption case against Shema in a move criticized as politically-motivated.

The next month, attention largely switched to the presidential election on 25 February. In the election, Katsina State voted for Atiku Abubakar (PDP); Abubakar won 46.2% of the vote, beating Bola Tinubu (APC) at 45.6% and Rabiu Kwankwaso (NNPP) at 6.6%. The result—considered a surprise as Katsina is Buhari's hame state, led to increased attention on the gubernatorial race. Campaign analysis in the wake of the presidential election from Vanguard noted that the APC had retained most downballot offices and appeared to be in a strong position. On the other hand, the EiE-SBM forecast projected Lado to win due to the presidential election results and Masari's unpopularity.

Election debates

Projections

Conduct

Electoral timetable

Pre-election
Due to widespread insecurity in the state, civil society groups raised concern about the safe conduct of the election in heavily-insecure areas.

General election

Results

By senatorial district 
The results of the election by senatorial district.

By federal constituency
The results of the election by federal constituency.

By local government area 
The results of the election by local government area.

See also 
 2023 Nigerian elections
 2023 Nigerian gubernatorial elections

Notes

References 

Katsina State gubernatorial election
2023
2023 Katsina State elections
Katsina